Matías Alfonso (born 29 February 2000) is a Paraguayan footballer who plays as a midfielder for River Plate (Montevideo).

Career

Starting his professional career playing for Uruguayan side Cerro in Segunda División, Alfonso signed for Uruguayan side River Plate (Montevideo) in January 2022.

References

External links
 

Living people
2000 births
Association football midfielders
Club Atlético River Plate (Montevideo) players
Expatriate footballers in Uruguay
Paraguayan expatriate footballers
Paraguayan footballers
C.A. Cerro players